The fifth generation (Generation V) of the Pokémon franchise features 156 fictional species of creatures introduced to the core video game series in the 2010 Nintendo DS games Pokémon Black and White. Some Pokémon in this generation were introduced in animated adaptations of the franchise before Black and White.

The following list details the 156 Pokémon of Generation V in order of their National Pokédex number. The first Pokémon, Victini, is number 494 and the last, Genesect, is number 649. In total, this generation added the most unique Pokémon of any generation. Alternate forms that result in type changes are included for convenience. Mega evolutions and regional forms are included on the pages for the generation in which they were introduced.

List of Pokémon

 Victini
 Snivy
 Servine
 Serperior
 Tepig
 Pignite
 Emboar
 Oshawott
 Dewott
 Samurott
 Patrat
 Watchog
 Lillipup
 Herdier
 Stoutland
 Purrloin
 Liepard
 Pansage
 Simisage
 Pansear
 Simisear
 Panpour
 Simipour
 Munna
 Musharna
 Pidove
 Tranquill
 Unfezant
 Blitzle
 Zebstrika
 Roggenrola
 Boldore
 Gigalith
 Woobat
 Swoobat
 Drilbur
 Excadrill
 Audino
 Timburr
 Gurdurr
 Conkeldurr
 Tympole
 Palpitoad
 Seismitoad
 Throh
 Sawk
 Sewaddle
 Swadloon
 Leavanny
 Venipede
 Whirlipede
 Scolipede
 Cottonee
 Whimsicott
 Petilil
 Lilligant
 Basculin
 Sandile
 Krokorok
 Krookodile
 Darumaka
 Darmanitan
 Maractus
 Dwebble
 Crustle
 Scraggy
 Scrafty
 Sigilyph
 Yamask
 Cofagrigus
 Tirtouga
 Carracosta
 Archen
 Archeops
 Trubbish
 Garbodor
 Zorua
 Zoroark
 Minccino
 Cinccino
 Gothita
 Gothorita
 Gothitelle
 Solosis
 Duosion
 Reuniclus
 Ducklett
 Swanna
 Vanillite
 Vanillish
 Vanilluxe
 Deerling
 Sawsbuck
 Emolga
 Karrablast
 Escavalier
 Foongus
 Amoonguss
 Frillish
 Jellicent
 Alomomola
 Joltik
 Galvantula
 Ferroseed
 Ferrothorn
 Klink
 Klang
 Klinklang
 Tynamo
 Eelektrik
 Eelektross
 Elgyem
 Beheeyem
 Litwick
 Lampent
 Chandelure
 Axew
 Fraxure
 Haxorus
 Cubchoo
 Beartic
 Cryogonal
 Shelmet
 Accelgor
 Stunfisk
 Mienfoo
 Mienshao
 Druddigon
 Golett
 Golurk
 Pawniard
 Bisharp
 Bouffalant
 Rufflet
 Braviary
 Vullaby
 Mandibuzz
 Heatmor
 Durant
 Deino
 Zweilous
 Hydreigon
 Larvesta
 Volcarona
 Cobalion
 Terrakion
 Virizion
 Tornadus
 Thundurus
 Reshiram
 Zekrom
 Landorus
 Kyurem
 Keldeo
 Meloetta
 Genesect

Explanatory notes

References

Lists of Pokémon
Video game characters introduced in 2010